70th Street station is a San Diego Trolley station served by the Green Line in La Mesa, California, in the United States. The next station west is Alvarado Medical Center and the next station east is Grossmont Transit Center.

One of the newer stations in the San Diego Trolley network having opened in 2005,  the facility is locally noted for its artwork using California native plants and recycled materials. Parts of the platform are paved with chips of colored used glass, the benches are made of cobblestones excavated from the site during the station's construction, and bench seats are made of recycled plastics. Landscaping includes edible wild strawberries, lemonade berry bushes, and native California wild roses.

The station provided direct service to Qualcomm Stadium during Chargers home games.

Station layout
There are two tracks, each served by a side platform.

See also
 List of San Diego Trolley stations

References

Green Line (San Diego Trolley)
San Diego Trolley stations
Railway stations in the United States opened in 2005
2005 establishments in California